Ayamelum is a local government area (LGA) in Anambra state, in the southeastern part of Nigeria with headquarters in Anaku. The towns that make up the local government are Anaku, Umueje, Omasi, Igbakwu, Umumbo, Omor, Umuerum, and Ifite Ogwari. Ayamelum’s area is situated at the border between Enugu state and Anambra state. The communities in the area are notable for food production.

The LGA has economic and agricultural potential that can generate funds and create employment. Anaku, Ifite Ogwari, and Omor in Ayamelum are noted for their rice production. Thus, the community benefits from the Lower Anambra-Imo River Basin Development Authority which enhances its agricultural activities. However, Ayamelum has no access road. The only entrance to the LGA is Otuocha-Anaku-Adani federal road, which has been in a terrible state. This lack of infrastructure prevents residents from taking their food products to towns and cities.

Secondary schools
Numerous secondary schools are located in Ayamelum:
 St. Joseph International Secondary School, Anaku (Catholic School) 
 Ekenedirichukwu Settlement Anaku 
 Universal Secondary School, Omasi
 Community Secondary School, Umumbo
 Community Secondary School, Igbakwu
 Community Secondary School, Ifite-Ogwari
 Riverside Secondary School, Umerum
 Ogbe High School, Anaku
 Amikwe Community Secondary School, Omor (Omor Town)
 Community Secondary School, Umueje
 Regina Caeli Secondary School, Omor (Catholic School)
 Community Secondary School. (Omor) 
 St Simon Faith International Secondary School, Omor (Omor Town Anglican School)
Inland school umerum
Ataka maingrant fishermen school umerum
Brainfield Secondary School, Omor (Private Owner Omor Town 
Sacred Heart of Jesus Academy, Ifite-Ogwari (Catholic School)

Communal clashes in Ayamelum LGA 
Long-standing land disputes in Ayamelum have resulted in violence among the Omor-Anaku communities, resulting in residents fleeing from their homes. Buildings were burnt, property and vehicles were destroyed, and many people injured by machete. The crisis in the two communities is known to center on the ownership of border farmland. These boundary disputes have been going on for 100 years. Many people have been killed in these clashes over the years. The government has set up the Ayamelum Boundary Adjustment and Peace Committee to restore peace and encourage co-existence among those in dispute in the community.

In other clashes, Omor and Umumbo communities in Ayamelum have been engulfed in conflict over land disputes. In these events, about 50 people have gone missing while about 300 persons have been injured. Also Omor and Igbakwu in the same local government

Climate 
The climate of Ayamelum is tropical humid with wet and dry seasons and annual rainfall between 1300-3000mm. These areas are characterized by high temperatures, rainfall, and humidity.

Nnamdi Azikiwe University campus in Ayamelum 

The Faculty of Agriculture of Nnamdi Azikiwe University is located in Ifite-Ogwari, one of the communities in Ayamelum LGA. Nnamdi Azikiwe University, Awka acquired the land, about 120 hectares, for the department.

References

LOCAL GOVERNMENT AREAS IN ANAMBRA STATE dated July 21, 2007; accessed October 4, 2007

Local Government Areas in Anambra State
Local Government Areas in Igboland